The Tamil Nadu women's cricket team is an Indian domestic cricket team representing the Indian state of Tamil Nadu. The team has represented the state in Women's Senior One Day Trophy (List A) and  Senior women's T20 league.

Current squad

Updated as on 1 February 2023

References

Women's cricket teams in India
Cricket in Tamil Nadu